Al-Jammasin al-Sharqi was a Palestinian Arab village in the Jaffa Subdistrict. It was depopulated during the 1948 Palestine War on March 17, 1948. It was located 9 km northeast of Jaffa.

History

Al-Jammasin's inhabitants were known to be descendants of nomads from the Jordan Valley.  In 1596, a Jammasin (Masra'at Hasana)  tribe appear in the  Ottoman  census, located in the Nahiya of Bani Sa'b of the Liwa of Nablus, paying taxes on goats, beehives and water buffalos.  Khalidi writes that judging from the absence of taxes on any crops, this Masra'at (farm) probably specialised in short-distance herding and semi-nomadic tasks.  The tribe was known to have settled in the area by the 18th century.

British Mandate era
In the 1922 census of Palestine conducted by the British Mandate authorities, the tribal area of Jammasin had a population of 200 Muslims,   while in the  1931 census  Jammasin esh-Sharqiya had 395  Muslim inhabitants. 

In the  1945 statistics  the population of Al-Jammasin al-Sharqi consisted of 730 Muslims and the land area was 358  dunams of land, according to an official land and population survey.  Of this land, Arabs used 53 dunams for citrus and bananas, 193 for plantations and irrigable land, 40 for cereals, while a total of 18 dunams were non-cultivable areas.

The children attended school on Al-Shaykh Muwannis.

1948, aftermath
In December, 1947,  Jewish agents reported that Arabs were leaving the Al-Jammasin villages. In  December 1947 and January 1948 the leaders of al-Shaykh Muwannis, Al-Mas'udiyya, Al-Jammasin al-Sharqi/Al-Jammasin al-Gharbi, and the mukhtars of Ijlil al-Qibliyya,  Ijlil al-Shamaliyya and  Abu Kishk  met with Haganah representatives  in Petah Tikva. These villages wanted peace, and promised not to harbor any Arab Liberation Armies or local Arab Militia. They further promised that, in the case they were not able to keep them out alone, they were to call on Haganah for help. The Jammasin villages, together with Abu Kishk, also jointly approached a Jewish police officer at  Ramat Gan.

References

Bibliography

External links
Welcome To al-Jammasin al-Sharqi
 al-Jammasin al-Sharqi, Zochrot
Survey of Western Palestine, Map 13: IAA,  Wikimedia commons

Arab villages depopulated during the 1948 Arab–Israeli War
District of Jaffa